Carole Walker is a British political news correspondent. She worked at the BBC until the end of March 2017, before returning as a freelance presenter on the news channel.

Biography
Walker attended North Walsham Girls' High School in Norfolk, attached to the all-male Paston College. She subsequently studied journalism at the London College of Printing.

At the BBC, Walker often fronted major events such as British general elections.

She worked for the BBC for more than 30 years. As a war correspondent she covered the fall of the Soviet Union, the Gulf War and the civil wars in Somalia and the Balkans. Since 1997, she concentrated on covering UK politics and in September 2012 presented the BBC Two daily political programme Daily Politics.

In April 2011, when she was 50, Walker openly criticised the then BBC Director General Mark Thompson for failing to curb the corporation's alleged "ageist" attitude towards women. In the BBC's in-house magazine, Ariel, Walker asserted that Thompson had broken his pledge to give her more presenting shifts.

In June 2020, she joined the newly-launched digital radio station Times Radio, presenting editions of the late evening show.

Walker has two children.

Books
Keighron, Peter, and Carole Walker. "Working in Television: Five Interviews." In, Hood, Stuart, editor. Behind the Screens: The Structure of British Television in the Nineties. London: Lawrence & Wishart, 1994.

See also
List of BBC newsreaders and reporters

References

External links
 
 TV Newsroom

BBC newsreaders and journalists
British television journalists
Living people
Year of birth missing (living people)